HMS Opportune (S20) was an Oberon-class submarine of the Royal Navy.

Design and construction

The Oberon class was a direct follow on of the Porpoise-class, with the same dimensions and external design, but updates to equipment and internal fittings, and a higher grade of steel used for fabrication of the pressure hull.

Displacement was 1,610 tons standard, 2,030 tons full load when surfaced, and 2,410 tons full load when submerged. Propulsion machinery consisted of 2 Admiralty Standard Range 16 VMS diesel generators, and two  electric motors, each driving a  3-bladed propeller at up to 400 rpm. Eight  diameter torpedo tubes were fitted (six facing forward, two aft), with a total payload of 24 torpedoes. The boats were fitted with Type 186 and Type 187 sonars, and an I-band surface search radar. The standard complement was 68: 6 officers, 62 sailors.

Opportune was laid down by Scotts Shipbuilding and Engineering Company on 26 October 1962, and launched on 14 February 1964. The boat was commissioned into the Royal Navy on 29 December 1964.

Operational history

Opportune attended the 1977 Silver Jubilee Fleet Review off Spithead when she was part of the Submarine Flotilla.

Decommissioning and fate
Opportune was paid off on 2 June 1993. For several years the vessel resided at Pounds scrapyard in Portsmouth.

References

Publications

 

Oberon-class submarines of the Royal Navy
Ships built on the River Clyde
1964 ships
Cold War submarines of the United Kingdom